Pagretar is a village development committee in Sindhupalchowk District in the Bagmati Zone of central Nepal. Kothe is a populated location within the committee area. In 1991, there were 633 houses, and at the time of the 2001 Nepal census Pagretar had a population of 3,352. 
, the population had become 2,952 (1,524 females and 1,428 males) in 762 households.

References

Populated places in Sindhupalchowk District